Notre Dame SC is a Barbados football club, based in Bayville on the southside of Bridgetown in the parish of Saint Michael.

Notre Dame is the second most successful club in Barbados football history, winning 9 league titles and 4 domestic cups.
They play their home games in the capital Bridgetown, in the Barbados' first division, the Barbados Premier Division.

Achievements
Barbados Premier Division: 9
 1997, 1998, 1999, 2000, 2002, 2004, 2005, 2008, 2010

Barbados FA Cup: 6
 1982, 1997, 2001, 2004, 2008, 2010

References

Football clubs in Barbados